Sepak takraw at the 2015 Southeast Asian Games was held at EXPO Hall 1, Singapore from 6 to 15 June 2015.

Chinlone, which was previously introduced at the 2013 SEA Games in Myanmar, was subsumed under the sport of sepak takraw at the 2015 Southeast Asian Games. Only 4 Chinlone events competed by men were held.

Participating nations
A total of 173 athletes from 10 nations will be competing in sepak takraw at the 2015 Southeast Asian Games:

Competition schedule
The following is the competition schedule for the sepak takraw competitions:

Medalists

Men's

Women's

Results

Men

Chinlone-Linking

Table-Preliminary Round

"Final"

Report

Chinlone-Same Stroke

Chinlone-Non-Repetition Primary

Chinlone-Non-Repetition Secondary

Medal table

References

External links
  

2015
2015 Southeast Asian Games events